García Gil Manrique (died 1655) was a Roman Catholic prelate who served as Bishop of Barcelona (1633–1655), Bishop of Gerona (1627–1633), and Auxiliary Bishop of Cuenca (1618–1627).

Biography
On 5 March 1618, García Gil Manrique was appointed during the papacy of Pope Paul V as Auxiliary Bishop of Cuenca and Titular Bishop of Utica.
On 29 April 1618, he was consecrated bishop by Giovanni Garzia Mellini, Cardinal-Priest of Santi Quattro Coronati with Francesco Sacrati (cardinal), Titular Archbishop of Damascus, and Cesare Ventimiglia, Bishop of Terracina, Priverno e Sezze, serving as co-consecrators.
On 30 August 1627, he was appointed during the papacy of Pope Urban VIII as Bishop of Gerona.
On 28 November 1633, he was appointed during the papacy of Pope Urban VIII as Bishop of Barcelona.
He served as Bishop of Barcelona until his death in 1655.

Episcopal succession
While bishop, he was the principal consecrator of:
Ramón Sentmenat y Lanuza, Bishop of Vic (1640); 
Damián Lopez de Haro y Villarda, Bishop of Puerto Rico (1644);

and the principal co-consecrator of:
Juan de la Torre Ayala, Bishop of Orense (1622); 
Fernando Valdés Llano, Bishop of Teruel (1625); 
Miguel Ayala, Bishop of Palencia (1625); 
Gutiérrez Bernardo de Quirós (Quiróz), Bishop of Tlaxcala (1626); 
Baltasar Borja, Bishop of Mallorca (1626);
Sebastião de Matos de Noronha, Bishop of Elvas (1626); and 
Juan Pereda Gudiel, Bishop of Oviedo (1627).

References

External links and additional sources
 (for Chronology of Bishops) 
 (for Chronology of Bishops) 

17th-century Roman Catholic bishops in Spain
Bishops appointed by Pope Paul V
Bishops appointed by Pope Urban VIII
1655 deaths
1575 births